Albert Patrick Picard (March 17, 1923 – July 1, 2019) was a Canadian ice hockey player with the Sudbury Wolves. He won a silver medal at the 1949 World Ice Hockey Championships in Stockholm, Sweden. He also played professionally with the Buffalo Bisons, Dallas Texans, Oakland Oaks, Houston Skippers, Houston Huskies, and Vancouver Canucks.

References

1923 births
2019 deaths
Canadian ice hockey goaltenders
Ice hockey people from Ontario
People from Kapuskasing
Vancouver Canucks (WHL) players
Oakland Oaks (PCHL) players
Canadian expatriates in the United States